WWAV (102.1 MHz) is a commercial FM radio station playing a variety hits radio format. Licensed to Santa Rosa Beach, Florida, the station serves the Emerald Coast and Fort Walton Beach area.  It is owned by JVC Broadcasting and uses the slogan "We Play EVERYTHING."

On December 22, 2020, Community Broadcasters, LLC, sold the entire Fort Walton Beach cluster to JVC Broadcasting for almost $2.3 million, which later closed on February 1, 2021.

References

External links

WAV
1984 establishments in Florida
Radio stations established in 1984